Women in Manufacturing (WiM) is a national trade association headquartered in Cleveland, Ohio, that promotes and supports women who are pursuing or have chosen a career in manufacturing. It is the only national trade association dedicated to providing year-round support to women in manufacturing careers, representing more than 12,000 members from 48 U.S. states and from 40 countries. WiM encompasses manufacturers of all types and welcomes individuals from every job function – from production to the C-Suite. Membership is available to women and men working within or with the manufacturing sector. WiM presently powers year-round virtual learning, bi-annual virtual career fairs, executive networking group services, a robust job board called WiMWorks, 20 meetings and conferences annually, 30 local U.S. chapters and 3 formal professional development programs. Our first international activity is scheduled to be held at EUROBLECH 2022 in Germany where we have our largest population of international members.

History
WiM was founded in 2011 as “Women in Metalforming” to be a supplementary group by the Precision Metalforming Association (PMA). The following year, PMA recognized the need for an organization that could serve as a national resource for women in the manufacturing industry and the name was changed to the Women in Manufacturing Association (WiM). WiM operated under PMA until 2015 when it became a separate, independent 501(c)(6) trade association in 2015. In November 2016, WiM launched its Education Foundation (WiMEF), which is officially designated as a 501(c)(3).

Organization

Membership
WiM is a membership-based organization with five categories: Student, Professional, Professional Plus, Retired and Corporate. Members are able to participate in virtual and in-person networking opportunities, professional development webinars, online discussion communities, and educational opportunities both regionally and nationally.

Leadership
The current Chairwoman of WiM Board of Directors is Virginia Harn, Principal for CliftonLarsonAllen (CLA). Allison Grealis is the Founder and President of WiM.

Chapters
The Women in Manufacturing Association has almost 30 local chapters throughout the United States which operate under the jurisdiction of the WiM national organization. These state-wide and regionally-based chapters provide members local access to networking, training, education and inspiration. Each Chapter offers activities and programming specific to the unique needs of the local area served. 
.

Funding
WiM receives funding from membership and programs fees, foundations, and corporations.

Partnerships
In 2016, WiM and Case Western Reserve University's (CWRU) Weatherhead School of Management, with the support of the GE Foundation, collaborated to launch the Leadership Lab for Women in Manufacturing, which provides executive education and training to individuals in mid-to-high level management roles in manufacturing. The Leadership Lab for Women in Manufacturing builds on the CWRU's Leadership Lab for Women in STEM, created in 2014 to provide professional development for women in male-dominated industries.

Also in 2016, WiM partnered with Arconic Foundation to create the Virtual Learning Series, a program consisting of six bimonthly webinars covering a variety of industry-related topics.

Events & Programs
WiM's largest annual event, the WiM SUMMIT, launched in 2010. The annual SUMMIT brings hundreds of members together to a location that changes each year, affording attendees the opportunity to experience manufacturing and develop their networks throughout the United States. The 2022 SUMMIT will be held in Atlanta, GA, on October 11–12.

WiMWorks, WiM's proprietary career center resource, is a platform for connecting job seekers with employers. The system's features include a board for job postings, an anonymous résumé bank, and an internal messaging system for users.

References 

Trade associations based in the United States
2011 establishments in Ohio
Organizations established in 2011
Manufacturing trade associations
Women's organizations based in the United States